Bruce Ministry may refer to:

 First Bruce Ministry
 Second Bruce Ministry
 Third Bruce Ministry